Mount Burrows is a peak,  high, located  west-southwest of Mount Queensland in the Deep Freeze Range, Victoria Land. The feature towers high above the lower, east side of Priestley Glacier. It was named by the New Zealand Antarctic Place-Names Committee for A.L. Burrows, Scientific Leader at Scott Base, 1964–65.

References 

Mountains of Victoria Land
Scott Coast